Pino is a fictional character that is featured in a Swedish book series and film series. Both the books and the films are for children up to the age of four. Pino who is a Bear with big ears features simple events that small children can relate to. Pino often goes out to play, but also does things that grown-ups do, like flying and working as a doctor.

The first book about Pino was published in 2002, and today there are 24 different stories published. The authors are Swedes Eva Pils and Agneta Norelid, while Kenneth Andersson has made the drawings. 20 short films has been made about Pino and has been broadcast on SVT's kids show Bolibompa and has also been distributed through DVD.Pino is also featured in a computer game, memory card game and toys in the form of a teddy bear.

Pino has become successful in France where he is called Tomi and 14 of the books have so far been published there. Pino has also been published in Norway and Japan.

Books
 Pinos dagbok – 2002
 Pinos sommarbok – 2004
 Pinos vinterbok – 2004
 Pinos födelsedag – 2005
 Pinos lekpark – 2005
 Pino är bäst – 2007
 Sov gott Pino – 2007
 Rita och Räkna med Pino
 Räkna med Pino – 2008
 Pinos bondgård – 2010
 Doktor Pino – 2010
 Pinos affär – 2010
 Pinos jul – 2010
 Pino och Hunden – 2010
 Pino ska ut och åka – 2010
 Pino på upptäcktsfärd – 2010
 Pinos pannkakskalas – 2010
 Pino går på tivoli – 2010
 Pino och katten – 2010
 Pino på utflykt – 2010
 Pino på cirkus – 2010
 Pinos dagis – 2010
 Pino på skattjakt – 2013
 Pino och pottan – 2014

DVD
Two DVDs has been released about Pino. The two DVDs consists of 10 animated films each.

Pino på äventyr (2010)
Pino och hans vänner (2010)

References

External links
Pinos official website

Literary characters introduced in 2002
Animated characters
Books about bears